Derrick Blaylock (born August 23, 1979) is a former American football running back of the National Football League. Blaylock was drafted in the 5th round of the 2001 NFL Draft by the Kansas City Chiefs. Blaylock also played for the New York Jets.

High school career
Blaylock attended Atlanta High School in Atlanta, Texas, and was a standout in football, track, and basketball.  In football, he was a three-time All-District selection.  In basketball, he was a second-team All-District selection and in track, he placed second on the 100 meter dash at the state Class 3A finals with a time of 10.7 seconds, and set the school record in the 100 meter dash with a time of 10.44 seconds.

Professional career
Blaylock scored four rushing touchdowns in one game for the Kansas City Chiefs along with Priest Holmes on October 24, 2004 vs the Atlanta Falcons. Blaylock would be one of 3 running backs for Kansas City that would rush for 100 yards in one season, along with Priest Holmes and Larry Johnson.

On February 28, 2007, the New York Jets released Blaylock.  On May 7, 2007 Blaylock signed a contract with the Washington Redskins, but was cut on September 3, after reaching an injury settlement.

References

1979 births
Living people
People from Atlanta, Texas
African-American players of American football
American football running backs
Stephen F. Austin Lumberjacks football players
Kansas City Chiefs players
New York Jets players
21st-century African-American sportspeople
20th-century African-American sportspeople